The Campeonato Carioca Série C is the fifth tier of football league of the state of Rio de Janeiro, Brazil.

List of champions

Following is the list with all the champions of the fifth level of Rio de Janeiro and their different nomenclatures over the years.

Titles by team

Teams in bold stills active.

By city

References